The California Department of Financial Institutions (DFI) was a government department of the California Business, Transportation and Housing Agency responsible for financial regulation of California's banking system.

Pursuant to the Governor's Reorganization Plan No. 2 of 2012, the Department of Financial Institutions and Department of Corporations became divisions of the California Department of Business Oversight (DBO) on July 1, 2013.

References 

Financial Institutions